Lady Butler may refer to:

 Eileen Sutherland-Leveson-Gower, Duchess of Sutherland (1891–1943), born Lady Eileen Butler
 Lady Eleanor Charlotte Butler (1739–1829), Irish noblewoman, one of the Ladies of Llangollen
 Eleanor Butler, Lady Wicklow, (1915–1997), Irish architect and politician
 Lady Eleanor Talbot (died 1468), whose married name was Butler, alleged wife of King Edward IV of England
 Eleanor Beaufort (1431–1501), wife of James Butler, 4th Earl of Ormond
Elizabeth Thompson (1846–1933), British painter
Elizabeth Butler-Sloss, Baroness Butler-Sloss (born 1933)
Lady Mary Butler (1689–1713), friend of Jonathan Swift

See also 

Butler dynasty

Title and name disambiguation pages